Pasi Tauriainen (born 4 October 1964) is a Finnish former international footballer. He is the father of current Chelsea midfielder Jimi Tauriainen, as well as current Miedź Legnica II midfielder Julius Tauriainen.

Career statistics

Club

Notes

International

Notes

International goals
Scores and results list Finland's goal tally first, score column indicates score after each Finland goal.

References

1964 births
Living people
Finnish footballers
Finnish expatriate footballers
Finland youth international footballers
Finland international footballers
Association football midfielders
Rovaniemen Palloseura players
K. Berchem Sport players
Helsingin Jalkapalloklubi players
Ekenäs IF players
Veikkausliiga players
Kakkonen players
Finnish expatriate sportspeople in Belgium
Expatriate footballers in Belgium
People from Rovaniemi
Sportspeople from Lapland (Finland)